Thor Thorvaldsen (31 May 1909 – 30 June 1987) was a Norwegian sailor and Olympic champion. He was born in Bamble and died in Bærum. He competed at the 1948 Summer Olympics in London, where he received a gold medal in the dragon class as helmsman on the boat Pan.

He competed at the 1952 Summer Olympics in Helsinki, where he again received a gold medal with Pan.

See also
List of Olympic medalists in Dragon class sailing

References

External links

1909 births
1987 deaths
People from Bamble
Norwegian male sailors (sport)
Olympic sailors of Norway
Sailors at the 1936 Summer Olympics – O-Jolle
Sailors at the 1948 Summer Olympics – Dragon
Sailors at the 1952 Summer Olympics – Dragon
Sailors at the 1956 Summer Olympics – Dragon
Olympic gold medalists for Norway
Olympic medalists in sailing
Medalists at the 1952 Summer Olympics
Medalists at the 1948 Summer Olympics
Sportspeople from Vestfold og Telemark